Joseph M. Demko School is a dual-track elementary-junior high school in the new Jensen lakes neighborhood in St. Albert, Alberta, Canada. The school is a member of St. Albert Public Schools, its parent school district. The school is named after Joseph Demko, a former teacher and superintendent of the district.

Programs 
Joseph M. Demko school is a dual-track school, offering courses through both the English and Logos Christian programs.

English 
The English program is available to students wishing to take their core courses in English. It encourages students to take an active role in their community, and promotes building relationships and working together.

Logos 
Logos is a Christian program offered within the public school system. Its curriculum is bible based, and offers to its students a "spiritually nurturing, intellectually challenging and disciplined environment." When Joseph M. Demko school opened, it began to host all students in the district who were enrolled in this program.

CTS 
The school has to have a full CTS, or Career and Technology, program.

History 
Joseph M. Demko school was granted funding on October 8, 2014, and was planned to cost $16 million to build. Construction of the building began in January 2017, and was planned to be completed for the new school year beginning September, 2018. Weather delays, however, set back the projected opening date to later in 2019. The school was built in the Jensen Lakes neighborhood, and services 900 Kindergarten to grade 9 students from the neighborhood and surrounding areas. Construction on the school coincided with the construction of neighboring Sister Alphonse Academy, an elementary-junior high school under Greater St. Albert Roman Catholic Separate School District No.734.

The school's name was selected by its board in September, 2015. It was named after Joseph Demko, a former teacher, principal, superintendent, and trustee at St. Albert Public Schools. In its announcement of the name, the board said that it "believes that schools should be named after persons or concepts that bring honour to the school and district by representing the district's values, beliefs and commitment to students. Mr. Demko exemplifies these traits and has touched thousands of lives during his time with our district.”

References 

Schools in St. Albert, Alberta